Manjit Tiwana (born 1947) is an Indian poet.

Biography

Tiwana's first poem was published in Nagmani when she was only sixteen. Manjit has authored seven collections of poetry,  the significant poetical works are: Ilham (1976), Ilzam (1980), Tarian di joon (1982), Unida Wartman (1987), Savitri (1989)and Jin Prem Kiyo.

Awards
She is the recipient of the Sahitya Akademi award (1990) for Uninda Wartman (Poetry) and the Shiromani Punjabi Kavi Puraskar by Punjab State Languages Department for the year 1999.

References

External links

The Trio of Punjabi Poetesses

1947 births
Living people
Indian women poets
Recipients of the Sahitya Akademi Award in Punjabi
Indian Sikhs
Punjabi-language poets
20th-century Indian poets
Women writers from Punjab, India
People from Patiala
Poets from Punjab, India
20th-century Indian women writers